Neils Red Covered Bridge was a historic wooden covered bridge in Greene Township in Greene County, Pennsylvania. It crossed Whiteley Creek. As of October 1978, it was one of nine historic covered bridges in Greene County.

It was listed on the National Register of Historic Places in 1979. it was destroyed in an arson fire on June 19, 1990, and was delisted from the National Register in 2018.

References 

Covered bridges on the National Register of Historic Places in Pennsylvania
Covered bridges in Greene County, Pennsylvania
Bridges completed in 1900
Wooden bridges in Pennsylvania
Bridges in Greene County, Pennsylvania
National Register of Historic Places in Greene County, Pennsylvania
Road bridges on the National Register of Historic Places in Pennsylvania
Burr Truss bridges in the United States
Covered bridges in the United States destroyed by arson
Former National Register of Historic Places in Pennsylvania
1900 establishments in Pennsylvania
1990 disestablishments in Pennsylvania
1990 crimes in the United States
Buildings and structures demolished in 1990